LACC may refer to:

Los Angeles
 Los Angeles Children's Chorus, a community children's choir for girls and boys with unchanged voices from the Los Angeles area ranging from ages 8 to 17
 Los Angeles City College, a public community college in the East Hollywood neighborhood of Los Angeles, California
 Los Angeles Common Council, the predecessor of the Los Angeles City Council
 Los Angeles Country Club
 Los Angeles College of Chiropractic, a chiropractic school in Los Angeles
 Los Angeles Convention Center, a convention center in downtown Los Angeles
 L.A. Comic Con, the Comic-Con franchise in Los Angeles
 Los Angeles Consular Corps, the association of nations' consulates in Los Angeles

Other uses
 London Area Control Centre
 Lidcombe Auburn Cycling Club, a cycling club based in the inner Western area of Sydney, Australia.
 Lake Avenue Congregational Church, Pasadena, Ca., USA

See also

 LACC1, gene and protein concerning laccase
 Lanthanum carbide (LaC2)
 
 
 
 LAC (disambiguation)